Todd Woodbridge and Mark Woodforde defeated Paul Haarhuis and Sandon Stolle in the final, 7–6(9–7), 6–4 to win the men's doubles tennis title at the 2000 French Open. With the win, the Woodies completed the career Grand Slam and the career Super Slam.

Mahesh Bhupathi and Leander Paes were the defending champions, but competed with different partners. Bhupathi played alongside David Prinosil, but lost to Juan Ignacio Carrasco and Jairo Velasco Jr. in the second round. Paes played alongside Jan Siemerink, but lost to Guy Forget and Guillaume Raoux in the first round.

Seeds
Champion seeds are indicated in bold text while text in italics indicates the round in which those seeds were eliminated.

Draw

Finals

Top half

Section 1

Section 2

Bottom half

Section 3

Section 4

References

External links
Association of Tennis Professionals (ATP) – main draw
2000 French Open – Men's draws and results at the International Tennis Federation

Men's Doubles
French Open by year – Men's doubles